Saint-Jean-de-Galaure is a commune in the Drôme department in Auvergne-Rhône-Alpes in southeastern France. It is the result of the merger, on 1 January 2022, of the communes of La Motte-de-Galaure and Mureils.

See also
Communes of the Drôme department

References

Communes of Drôme
Communes nouvelles of Drôme
Populated places established in 2022
2022 establishments in France